Savnik may refer to:

Šavnik, a town in Montenegro
Šavnik (river), a short river flowing through the town of Šavnik
Savnik (surname)